Clifton Township may refer to:

Arkansas
 Clifton Township, Faulkner County, Arkansas, in Faulkner County, Arkansas

Kansas
 Clifton Township, Washington County, Kansas, in Washington County, Kansas

 Clifton Township, Wilson County, Kansas

Minnesota
 Clifton Township, Lyon County, Minnesota
 Clifton Township, Traverse County, Minnesota

Missouri
 Clifton Township, Randolph County, Missouri

North Carolina
 Clifton Township, Ashe County, North Carolina

North Dakota
 Clifton Township, Cass County, North Dakota, in Cass County, North Dakota

Pennsylvania
 Clifton Township, Lackawanna County, Pennsylvania

South Dakota
 Clifton Township, Beadle County, South Dakota, in Beadle County, South Dakota
 Clifton Township, Spink County, South Dakota, in Spink County, South Dakota

Township name disambiguation pages